Brunel Sunergy is a yacht. She finished eight in the 1997–98 Whitbread Round the World Race skippered by Hans Bouscholte and Roy Heiner.

Career
Brunel Sunergy was designed by Judel/Vrolijk and built by Holland Composites.

References

Volvo Ocean Race yachts
Sailing yachts of the Netherlands
Volvo Ocean 60 yachts
1990s sailing yachts